This is a list of qualifying teams for the 2012 NCAA Division I men's basketball tournament. A total of 68 teams entered the tournament. Thirty of the teams earned automatic bids by winning their conference tournaments. The automatic bid of the Ivy League, which did not conduct a postseason tournament, went to its regular season champion. The remaining 37 teams were granted at-large bids, which were extended by the NCAA Selection Committee. All teams were seeded 1 to 16 within their regionals, while the Selection Committee seeded the entire field from 1 to 68. For the first time ever, the Selection Committee disclosed each team's seed within the entire field following the announcement of the entire bracket.

Automatic bids 
Automatic bids to the tournament were granted for winning a conference championship tournament, except for the automatic bid of the Ivy League given to the regular season champion. Seeds listed were seeds within the conference tournaments. Runners-up in bold face were given at-large berths.

At-large bids

Tournament seeds (list by region) 

*See First Four.

Conferences with multiple bids 

All other conferences have only one bid (see Automatic Bids)
NOTE: Teams in bold represent the conference's automatic bid.

Last four teams out 

The Selection Committee also announced the last four teams out of the tournament as part of the Hardcore Brackets special following announcement of the teams. In order, they were Oral Roberts, Miami (Florida), Nevada, and Drexel. Oral Roberts, Nevada, and Drexel were automatically selected, as regular-season champions, for berths in the National Invitation Tournament, while Miami was also selected for a berth by the NIT Selection Committee.

Bids by state  

References

NCAA Division I men's basketball tournament qualifying teams
 
qualifying teams